Sonali Cable is a 2014 Indian Bollywood film directed by Charudutt Acharya and produced by Ramesh Sippy and Rohan Sippy. The script, penned by Acharya himself, was one of the eight scripts selected for Mumbai Mantra-Sundance Institute Screenwriters Lab 2012, chosen through an evaluation process of submissions from around the world, including the United States, United Kingdom, Italy, France and Germany. Newcomer, Rhea Chakraborty, has been hired to play a pivotal role. Ali Fazal is paired opposite Rhea while Raghav Juyal makes his acting debut with this film. The film was released on 17 October 2014.

Plot
Set in the cable internet turf war of Mumbai, Sonali Cable is the story of a girl Sonali (Rhea Chakraborty) and her ‘internet boys’, including her brother Sadda who are working in their own internet cable wire shop. One day when a new police station starts in their region Sonali reaches there for giving connection. There she meets her old school friend, now graduated from a university in the U.S., Raghu (Ali Fazal) who remembers her name, and even her roll number 43 while they were studying in school. They fall in love. During that time Sonali faces problem because a big industrial company "Shining" starts providing broadband services. During Ganapati festival Sonali and Raghu consummate their love. On the same night Sadda, Sonali's brother gets hit by some local goons trying to vandalize their shop. Sadda succumbs to his injuries. Sonali gets determined to take revenge on the company.

Sonali Cable is like a 'David versus Goliath' story, in the thick of the cable internet turf war in Mumbai.  At last Sonali wins the war by spying on the corruptions of the people who worked against her. Later Sonali starts an internet cable shop in the name of her brother Sadda. Raghu joins her in the shop and in her life.

Cast
 Rhea Chakraborty as Sonali Tandel
 Ali Fazal as Raghu Pawar
 Raghav Juyal as Sadaa
 Anupam Kher as Boss-Vaghela, Owner of Sunshine Cable
 Smita Jaykar as Meena Tai Pawar, Raghu's Mother 
 Swanand Kirkire as Dattaram Tandel (Baba), Sonali's father
 Arun Bali as Old Sikh gentlemen
  Mrigendra Konwar as Vidi
  Muzammil Qureshi as Jayyu
  Faisal Rashid as Bobby

Soundtrack
The album is released on 9 September 2014.

Critical reception
Sonali Cable received mixed reviews from critics.

References

External links

2014 films
2014 drama films
Films shot in Mumbai
2010s Hindi-language films
Indian drama films
Hindi-language drama films
Films scored by Daniel B. George
Films scored by Raghav Sachar
Films scored by Amjad Nadeem
Films scored by Mikey McCleary